Oregon is a ghost town in Boone County, in the U.S. state of Arkansas.

History
The Oregon post office closed in 1896. The community was named for the territory of Oregon.

References

Geography of Boone County, Arkansas